Raffaello Sernesi (December 25, 1838 – August 9, 1866) was an Italian painter and medallist associated with the Macchiaioli group.

He was born in Florence in modest circumstances. After an apprenticeship to a local engraver, he enrolled at the Accademia of Florence in 1856, where he studied under Antonio Ciseri. As part of his training he made copies of the works of quattrocento artists such as Masaccio and Botticelli. In 1858 his father died, and Sernesi left the Academy in order to help support his family as an engraver and medallist. In 1859 he began frequenting the Caffè Michelangiolo and met the artists of the Macchiaioli, including Odoardo Borrani, who became a close friend.

Sernesi served as a volunteer in the Second Italian War of Independence in 1859. Upon his return to Florence later that year, he made his first plein air landscape paintings. Norma Broude says these works are characterized by "the azure and terracotta hues typical both of Tuscany's landscape and its fresco tradition" and says they reveal "a taste for rectilinear clarity in spatial and compositional organization". Sernesi exhibited his painting Pastura in montagna ("Mountain Pastures") at the Brera National Exhibition in 1861 and at the Florentine Promotrice in 1862. In 1862 he traveled to Naples and later to Ischia. He exhibited two paintings at the Milan exhibition in 1865.

In 1866 he joined Garibaldi's campaign in the Third Italian War of Independence. On July 16 he suffered a serious wound to the leg and was taken prisoner by the Austrians. He was taken to Bolzano for treatment, but his reluctance to have his leg amputated led to his death from gangrene on August 9, 1866.

Notes

References

Broude, Norma (1987). The Macchiaioli: Italian Painters of the Nineteenth Century. New Haven and London: Yale University Press. 
Steingräber, Erich, & Matteucci, Giuliano (1984). The Macchiaioli: Tuscan Painters of the Sunlight : March 14 – April 20, 1984. New York: Stair Sainty Matthiesen in association with Matthiesen, London. 

1838 births
1866 deaths
Painters from Florence
19th-century Italian painters
Italian male painters
Accademia di Belle Arti di Firenze alumni
19th-century Italian male artists